Digital automatic coupling (DAC) has been developed in the 2020s to replace the English Buffers and chain couplings, initially in Europe.

It resembles the Scharfenberg coupler with extra contacts to join electrical circuits and air hoses.

Advantages 
 Longer trains up to 750m.
 Brakes remotely controlled like ECPB.
 Monitoring of train and wagon performance.
 Safety. No need for shunter to climb between buffers.

Other systems 
Couplings based on AAR and SA3 already have automated mechanical couplings, so do some of the advantageous features of DAC are lessened. These have a maximum draw gear load well in excess of that possible with the DAC, say 1800m instead of 750m.

Makers 
 Dellner

Videos 
 Demonstration of DAC 1
 Demonstration of DAC 2

See also 
 Railway coupling
 Railway coupling by country
 Shift2Rail

References 

Rail technologies